Waterbeach is a large village in Cambridgeshire, United Kingdom. It may also refer to:

Waterbeach railway station, serving the village
RAF Waterbeach and Barracks, a former military base near the village
Waterbeach Abbey, a former abbey near the village
Waterbeach, West Sussex, England
The Waterbeach, a health spa in Goodwood House, near Westhampnett, West Sussex, United Kingdom